The Floating Lives is a 2010 Vietnamese film based on a short story of the same name by Nguyen Ngoc Tu. It generated revenues of 17 billion VND in 2010 (around US$0.8 million).

Origin
"The Endless Field" was written in 2006 by Nguyen Ngoc Tu and became a controversial short story at once. BHD (Hãng phim Việt) bought its copyright at a reasonable price. "The Endless Field" was made into the Vietnamese feature film Floating Lives in 2010.

The English translation appears in a collection of NNT short stories titled Floating Lives. The translator is Luu ThanhThuy and the publisher is ASEAN (2013).

Movie making group
The Floating Lives is an co-operational movie of BHD, Vietnam Studio and Mega Media.
Director: Nguyen Phan Quang Binh
Producer: Jonathan Foo, Ngo Thi Bich Hanh, Ngo Thi Bich Hien.
Script writer: Nguyen Ho
Director of photography: Nguyen Tranh
Editor: Nguy Ngu
Cast:
Dustin Nguyen--- Ut Vo (in the original novel is Ut Vu)
Do Thi Hai Yen--- Suong.
Ninh Dương Lan Ngọc--- Nuong (Ut Vo's daughter)
Vo Thanh Hoa---Dien (Ut Vo's son)
Tang Thanh Ha--- Ut Vo's wife.

References

External links

Vietnamese drama films
Films based on works by Vietnamese writers